Danylo Dutkevych (born ) is a Ukrainian male  track cyclist, riding for the national team. He competed in the team sprint event at the 2010 UCI Track Cycling World Championships. He placed top ten 3 times in his career.

References

External links
 Profile at cyclingarchives.com

1990 births
Living people
Ukrainian track cyclists
Ukrainian male cyclists
Place of birth missing (living people)
21st-century Ukrainian people